is a Japanese film director who specializes in films set in Okinawa, featuring Okinawan music, language, themes and atmosphere. He shared the Directors Guild of Japan New Directors Award for his debut film, Pineapple Tours, which was an omnibus film co-directed with Tsutomu Makiya and Hayashi Tōma. He won the award for Best Director at the 25th Hochi Film Award for Nabbie's Love.

Filmography
 Pineapple Tours (1992) (one short of three)
 Nabbie's Love (1999)
 Hotel Hibiscus (2002)
 Koishikute (2007)
 Manatsu no Yo no Yume aka "Okinawan Midsummer Night's Dream" (2009)
 The Zen Diary (2022)

References

1960 births
Living people
Japanese film directors
People from Kyoto